Euphrasia vernalis is a species of flowering plant belonging to the family Orobanchaceae.

References

vernalis